Amerotyphlops brongersmianus, known commonly as Brongersma's worm snake or the South American striped blindsnake, is a species of harmless blind snake in the family Typhlopidae. The species is native to South America and Trinidad and Tobago in the Caribbean. No subspecies are currently recognized.

Etymology
The specific name, brongersmianus, is in honor of Dutch herpetologist Leo Brongersma.

Geographic range
A. brongersmianus is found in South America (and the Caribbean island of Trinidad) south through mainland South America (east of the Andes) as far as Buenos Aires Province in Argentina. In between it is also known to occur in Colombia, Venezuela, Guyana, Suriname, Peru, Brazil, Bolivia and Paraguay.

The type locality given is "Barra de Itaipe, Ilheus, Bahia [Salvador]", [Brazil].

Habitat
The preferred natural habitats of A. brongersmianus are forest and savanna.

Description
It has 20 scale rows around the body. The number of dorsal scales from the rostral scale to the terminal spine is, on average, 232.

Diet
The diet of A. brongersmianus from a semideciduous forest in Central Brazil consisted of ants of all stages of development, while earlier studies also mention termites and unspecified insects.

Reproduction
The species A. brongersmianus is oviparous.

References

Further reading

Avila RW, Ferreira VL, Souza VB (2006). "Biology of the blindsnake Typhlops brongersmianus (Typhlopidae) in a semideciduous forest from central Brazil". Herpetological Journal 16 (4): 403–405.

Hedges SB, Marion AB, Lipp KM, Marin J, Vidal N (2014). "A taxonomic framework for typhlopid snakes from the Caribbean and other regions (Reptilia, Squamata)". Caribbean Herpetology (49): 1-61. (Amerotyphlops brongersmianus, new combination, and type species of Amerotyphlops, new genus, p. 43).
Vanzolini PE (1972). "Typhlops brongersmai spec. nov. from the coast of Bahia, Brasil (Serpentes, Typhlopidae)". Zoologische Mededelingen [Leiden] 47 (3): 27-29 + one figure.
Vanzolini PE (1976). "Typhlops brongersmianus, a new name for Typhlops brongersmai Vanzolini, 1972, preoccupied (Serpentes, Typhlopidae)". Papéis Avulsos de Zoologia [São Paulo] 29 (24): 247.

brongersmianus
Snakes of the Caribbean
Snakes of South America
Reptiles of Argentina
Reptiles of Bolivia
Reptiles of Brazil
Reptiles of Colombia
Reptiles of Ecuador
Reptiles of French Guiana
Reptiles of Guyana
Reptiles of Paraguay
Reptiles of Peru
Reptiles of Suriname
Reptiles of Venezuela
Reptiles of Trinidad and Tobago
Taxa named by Paulo Vanzolini
Reptiles described in 1976